M1 GOLD is a Croatian commercial cable television movie channel based in Zagreb, Croatia. The program is mainly produced in Croatian and Bosnian language. It is available via cable systems and IPTV platforms throughout the Bosnia and Herzegovina and Croatia.

References

External links 
 M1 Film
 M1 FILM in Facebook

Mass media in Sarajevo
Movie channels
Television stations in Bosnia and Herzegovina